Raoul Voss is a German association football coach.

Playing career
Voss played as a defender for the Florida International University and TGM SV Jügesheim.

Managerial career
Voss became an assistant coach at Florida International University after a series of knee injuries ended his playing career. He would continue his coaching and technical staff development in Germany at both TSG Hoffenheim and Concordia Hamburg.

Returning to south Florida, Voss found work as an assistant coach with the NASL club, Fort Lauderdale Strikers until he was let go with head coach Gunter Kronsteiner in November 2015.

He joined Tampa Bay Rowdies in December 2015. Voss spent two seasons with the Rowdies, through their transition from NASL to the USL ahead of the 2017 season.

Penn FC
Voss was appointed his first professional head coaching position in February 2018 at Penn FC. He became the re-branded club's first official head coach.

Statistics

References

External links

 

Living people
1983 births
People from Offenbach (district)
Sportspeople from Darmstadt (region)
German footballers
Association football defenders
Penn FC coaches
FIU Panthers men's soccer players
Tampa Bay Rowdies coaches
Fort Lauderdale Strikers coaches
Footballers from Hesse
German football managers
TGM SV Jügesheim players
German expatriate footballers
German expatriate sportspeople in the United States
Expatriate soccer players in the United States
German expatriate football managers
Expatriate soccer managers in the United States